Arvan (also Romanized as Arvān) is a village in Kharaqan-e Gharbi Rural District, Central District, Avaj County, Qazvin Province, Iran. At the 2006 census, its population was 432, in 121 families.

It is also a branch of Bajelan tribe in Lorestan Province.

References 

Populated places in Avaj County